Carlos Rubén Esteban Rodríguez (born 26 March 1983), known as Carlos Rubén, is a Spanish footballer who plays for CD Guijuelo as an attacking midfielder.

Club career
Born in El Real de la Jara, Province of Seville, Carlos Rubén finished his formative with Real Zaragoza, and made his senior debuts with the reserves in the 2002–03 season, in Segunda División B. In the 2005 summer he joined Mérida UD, also in the third level.

On 19 June 2008 Carlos Rubén signed a two-year deal with SD Eibar, in Segunda División. On 3 September he played his first game as a professional, starting in a 0–1 away loss against CD Castellón for the campaign's Copa del Rey; five days later he scored twice in his league debut, a 3–2 home win over CD Tenerife.

On 30 January 2010, Carlos Rubén was loaned to CD Guijuelo. In the following year, after featuring rarely for the Basque, he joined Extremadura UD.

On 21 July 2013 Carlos Rubén signed with former club Guijuelo, still in the third level

References

External links

1983 births
Living people
People from Sierra Norte (Seville)
Sportspeople from the Province of Seville
Spanish footballers
Footballers from Andalusia
Association football midfielders
Segunda División players
Segunda División B players
Tercera División players
Real Zaragoza B players
Mérida UD footballers
SD Eibar footballers
CD Guijuelo footballers